For LP Fans Only is a compilation album by  American singer and musician Elvis Presley, released on February 6, 1959 by RCA Victor. It compiled previously released material from an August 1956 recording session at 20th Century Fox Stage One, a September 1956 session at Radio Recorders in Hollywood, sessions on January 10 and 11 at the RCA Victor Studios in Nashville, two more at the RCA Victor Studios in New York, and multiple sessions at Sun Studio. The album reached number 19 on the Billboard Top Pop Albums chart.

Content
After Presley's induction into the United States Army on March 24, 1958, RCA Victor and Presley's manager, Colonel Tom Parker, were faced with the prospect of keeping his name before the public for two years with no possibility of live performances or movies, and few unissued marketable recordings in the vault. A recording session was arranged for two days in June, which yielded enough items for five more single sides, singles being the commercial focus for rock and roll in the 1950s. Four of those tracks would be issued on 45s in 1958 and 1959 during his absence while doing military service.

Presley, however, also did well in the albums market. Each of his previous six LPs charted no lower than number three, and RCA wished to continue to release albums by their hot commodity given his sales record. Much of Presley's material had been issued on single records, not on LP. For this album, RCA Victor collected nine tracks previously available in single form only, as well as "Poor Boy" from the Love Me Tender EP. Four of the tracks had been issued on Sun Records with limited release, and were very difficult to come by outside of the south. However all 5 Sun singles were reissued by RCA Victor in November 1955 and remained in print through the 1970s.

"That's All Right (Mama)" was never issued as a single in the UK during Presley's lifetime.

Reissues
RCA first reissued the original 10 track album For LP Fans Only on compact disc in 1989. The album is included in a 25 disc package, "The Perfect Blues Collection", released by Sony in 2011. The album is also available in the 2016 60 CD boxed set Elvis Presley - The Complete RCA Album Collection.

Collective personnel
 Elvis Presley – vocals, rhythm guitar
 Scotty Moore – lead guitar
 Chet Atkins – rhythm guitar
 Floyd Cramer – piano
 Shorty Long – piano on "My Baby Left Me"
 Gordon Stoker – piano, backing vocals
 Bill Black – bass
 D.J. Fontana – drums
 Jimmie Lott – drums
 Johnny Bernero – drums
 The Jordanaires – backing vocals
 Ben Speer – backing vocals
 Brock Speer – backing vocals

Track listing

Chart performance

References

Jorgenson, Ernst (1998). Elvis Presley: A Life In Music - The Complete Recording Sessions. New York: St. Martin's Press.

External links

LPM-1990 For LP Fans Only Guide part of The Elvis Presley Record Research Database

1959 compilation albums
Elvis Presley compilation albums
RCA Victor albums
Albums recorded at Sun Studio
Covers albums
Albums produced by Sam Phillips
Albums produced by Steve Sholes